The Victorian Socialists (VS) is a democratic socialist political party based in the Australian state of Victoria.

The Victorian Socialists' stated aims are "to put politicians on a worker's wage so they live like the rest of us" and "to get socialists into parliament who will fight to make workers richer and billionaires poorer".

, the party is represented in local government on the Maribyrnong City Council by Socialist Alternative member Jorge Jorquera.

History
The Victorian Socialists began as a collaboration between Socialist Alternative and the Socialist Alliance. However, Socialist Alliance withdrew from the grouping in May 2020, citing disagreements with Socialist Alternative. 

The party's formation was announced publicly on 5 February 2018. It was officially registered by the Victorian Electoral Commission on 6 June 2018.

In August 2018, the party announced that it would field candidates for the 2018 Victorian state election in every Legislative Council seat and several Legislative Assembly electorates. Candidates included the former Geelong Trades Hall Secretary Tim Gooden for the Western Victoria Region and local councillors Stephen Jolly and Sue Bolton for the Northern Metropolitan Region.

The 2018 election campaign gained support from several trade unions including the ETU, VAHPA, UFU, CFMMEU (MUA division), AMIEU and NUW. It also won the support of several local immigrant diasporas and community organisations. Endorsements were received from several prominent left-wing personalities, such as Tariq Ali, Noam Chomsky, Gary Foley, Tom Ballard, Corrine Grant, and Helen Razer. The party achieved a vote of 4.2% in the Northern Metropolitan Region while achieving 7.2% of the vote for the lower house seat of Broadmeadows, in a field of four candidates.

In the 2019 federal election, VS ran candidates for the electorates of Calwell, Wills, and Cooper. The party was registered at a federal level with the Australian Electoral Commission on 7 April 2019. The party won votes of 4.6% in Calwell, 4.5% in Wills, and 4.2% in Cooper.

In September 2019, following allegations of family violence, Jolly was suspended from VS pending an investigation, leading him to resign from the party.

In the 2020 Victorian local government elections, the party fielded candidates for Darebin, Hume, Maribyrnong, Melbourne and Moreland, and a ticket for the Lord and Deputy Lord Mayor of Melbourne. Socialist Alternative member Jorge Jorquera became the first Victorian Socialists candidate to be elected to office, winning a seat on the Maribyrnong City Council.

VS ran candidates for the House of Representatives and the Senate in the 2022 federal election, and subsequently launched a campaign to win a seat in the 2022 Victorian state election.

Members of the party are involved in activist campaigns for a range of progressive causes. In July 2022, VS Assistant Secretary and 2022 state election candidate Liz Walsh was the organiser of large demonstrations in Melbourne, protesting the overturning of abortion rights by the United States Supreme Court, as well as calling for expanded access to abortion and increased healthcare funding in Australia.

VS ran candidates in the west and north of Melbourne for the 2022 Victorian state election, reportedly mobilising over 1000 volunteers for its campaign and knocking on over 180,000 doors. The party increased its vote from 2018, with its best result being a score of 9.3% in the seat of Footscray.

Member parties

Former

Policies
The Victorian Socialists claim to oppose "business as usual" politics, which the party declares has segregated Victoria into wealthy, well-resourced areas and less wealthy, under-resourced ones. As such, the party supports a platform that includes the reversal of historical privatization of industries, along with strong support for labour unions. The party proposes the creation of a publicly owned electricity grid, along with increased funding for transportation, healthcare systems and public education, while removing government funding from private schools who have more resources than is necessary to meet the Schooling Resource Standard. In order to pay for these policies, the Victorian Socialists support the introduction of a wealth tax, a tax on luxury properties (defined as the 25,000 most expensive residencies in Victoria), ending the ability of businesses and organizations to receive land tax exemptions, and instituting or increasing numerous other taxes on large corporations.

The party denounces "divide and conquer" political tactics, and as such emphasizes support for transgender rights, Aboriginal land rights and a treaty with Aboriginal Australians, as well as support for asylum seekers. The Victorian Socialists also support the introduction of a carbon neutral economy by 2035. In addition, the party seeks to cap the pay of Members of Parliament at AUD $87,000 per year, equivalent to that of a six-year nurse.

Electoral results

Federal

Victoria

Notable members

See also
 Socialism in Australia

References

Further reading

 
 

2018 establishments in Australia
Anti-racism in Australia
Political parties established in 2018
Political parties in Victoria (Australia)
Political party alliances in Australia
Socialist parties in Australia
Democratic socialist parties in Oceania